Soia, SOIA, or variant, may refer to:

People
 Soia Mentschikoff (1915–1984) Russian-American lawyer

 Elena Soia (born 1981), Russian swimmer

Places
 Soiano del Lago (Gardesano: Soià), Brescia, Lombardy, Italy

Groups, organizations, companies
 Sick of It All, U.S. hardcore punk band
 System for the Observation of and Information on the Alps, see List of organizations with .int domain names

Other uses
 Sick of It All (EP), a 1997 record by the eponymous U.S. band
 Simultaneous offset instrument approach, a type of instrument approach in aviation
 Security of Information Act, the Canadian Official Secrets law

See also

 
 Soja (disambiguation)
 Soya (disambiguation)
 Soy (disambiguation)
 Soi (disambiguation)
 SOJ (disambiguation)